Choba or Choba, Port Harcourt is a neighbourhood in Port Harcourt, Rivers State, Nigeria.

Choba was originally an Ikwerre village on the outer fringes of Port Harcourt, governed by a paramount king. The current king is Eze Raymond Echendu. As Port Harcourt has expanded Choba has been assimilated into the greater city conurbation.  Choba is one of 17 electoral wards administered by the Obio-Akpor Local Government Council. The population in 1991, according to the national census, was 10,968, in 1996 it was estimated to have increased to 12,980, and 27,253 in 2008.

It has a straight road which leads to a checkpoint heading to other states in Nigeria such as Bayelsa State and Delta State to the west.

Education 
In 1975 the University of Port Harcourt was established in Choba. It is now one of the major contributors to the local economy and the area's population growth. It has three campuses in Choba. They are Abuja campus, Delta campus and Choba campus.

References 

Neighbourhoods in Port Harcourt
Populated places in Rivers State